The women's individual was an archery event held as part of the Archery at the 1992 Summer Olympics programme. Like other archery events at the Olympics, it featured the recurve discipline. All archery was done at a range of 70 metres. 61 archers competed.

The competition format was completely revamped from prior Games. Head-to-head competition was introduced, after a ranking round. Furthermore, all archery was now done at a range of 70 metres whereas previously multiple distances were used.

The competition began with a 144-arrow ranking round. The top 32 individual archers were seeded into a single-elimination tournament called the "Olympic round". For each match, the archers shot 12 arrows. In all matches, losers were eliminated and received a final rank determined by their score in that round, with the exception of the semifinals. The losers of the semifinals competed in the bronze medal match. The scores of the ranking round were also used to determine the team ranks for the team competition.

Results

Elimination round

Knockout stage

References

Sources
 Official Report
 

Archery at the 1992 Summer Olympics
1992 in women's archery
Women's events at the 1992 Summer Olympics